The DeLand Red Hats were a minor-league baseball team in DeLand, Florida that played in the Florida State League (FSL) from 1936–1954. They played in Conrad Park, near Stetson University.

Early years
After the FSL was re-organized in 1936 the Red Hats were called simply the DeLand Reds and were affiliated with the Cincinnati Reds as a Class D team. In 1938 they moved into the Chicago White Sox organization. In 1939 they were renamed the Red Hats, and featured many players who were to be Washington Senators, such as starting pitcher Mickey Haefner. As a result, the Senators made DeLand part of its minor-league organization in 1940. The club was unaffiliated the next season and, during World War II, was part of the Florida East Coast League, as the FSL ceased operations temporarily. The major-league St. Louis Browns used Conrad Park in 1942 for spring training, for only that year, but were not affiliated with the club otherwise. In fact, the Red Hats would not be affiliated with any major-league organization again, even after returning to the FSL in 1946.

1950s Champions
The biggest Red Hats star may have been Al Pirtle, a career minor-leaguer and FSL star, whom they acquired in 1950. Pirtle never made the majors (or even out of Class D ball, playing his entire seven-year career in the FSL, despite a career .333 batting average), but his presence heralded a four-year run of success for the club. The team in 1950 posted a record of 82-57 while Pirtle batted .345 and had 38 doubles. After several playoff disappointments, they finally won their first FSL championship that year. They came back in 1951 even stronger, winning 90 games and a second FSL title. Now clearly the best team in the league, 1952 was their best year statistically, with a terrific 95-40 (.703) record. However, they lost the first playoff round and would not three-peat. In 1953 they won a more modest 78 games, but made it all the way to the FSL championship again. As it happened they would not win their third title, losing to the Daytona Beach Islanders.

1954 would prove to be the final season for the Red Hats. Attendance was down all across the FSL, a trend attributed to television, and the DeLand club was relocated to Gainesville and changed their name.

The ballpark
DeLand teams played at Conrad Park. The ballpark was also home of several other clubs, notably the Sun Caps and the Suns, the Stetson University Hatters, and the Daytona Cubs. The original Conrad Park was razed in 1998 and the site today is home to Melching Field at Conrad Park.

Notable alumni

 Mickey Haefner (1939)

 Harry Rice (1938-1939)

 Bama Rowell (1954)

Year by year results

References

Baseball teams established in 1936
Defunct Florida State League teams
Chicago White Sox minor league affiliates
Cincinnati Reds minor league affiliates
Washington Senators minor league affiliates
Defunct baseball teams in Florida
1936 establishments in Florida
Baseball teams disestablished in 1954
1954 disestablishments in Florida
Sports in Volusia County, Florida